Douglas County is a county located in the U.S. state of Nebraska. As of the 2020 United States Census, the population is 584,526. It is the state's most populous county, home to well over one-fourth of Nebraska's residents. Its county seat is Omaha, the state's largest city. The county was established in 1854 and named after Stephen A. Douglas (1813–1861), who was then serving as Senator from Illinois.

Douglas County is part of the Omaha-Council Bluffs, NE-IA Metropolitan Statistical Area.

In the Nebraska license plate system, Douglas County was represented by the prefix "1" (as it had the largest number of vehicles registered in the state when the license plate system was established in 1922). In 2002, the state discontinued the 1922 system in the three most populous counties: Douglas, Lancaster, and Sarpy counties.

Geography
Douglas County is on the east side of Nebraska. Its east boundary line abuts the west boundary line of the state of Iowa, across the Missouri River. The Elkhorn River runs southward through the west-central part of Douglas County, and it is bordered on east (Missouri River) and west (Platte River) by rivers.

Major highways

  Interstate 80
  Interstate 480
  Interstate 680
  U.S. Highway 6
  U.S. Highway 75
  U.S. Highway 275
  Nebraska Highway 31
  Nebraska Highway 36
  Nebraska Highway 50
  Nebraska Highway 64
  Nebraska Highway 85
  Nebraska Highway 92
  Nebraska Highway 133

Adjacent counties

 Dodge County – northwest
 Washington County – north
 Pottawattamie County, Iowa – east
 Sarpy County – south
 Saunders County – west

Protected areas
 Bluestem Prairie Preserve
 Two Rivers State Recreation Area

Demographics

2020 census
As of the 2020 United States Census, there were 584,526 people in the county. The population density was 1,724 people per square mile (664/km2).  The racial makeup of the county was 68.8% White, 11.5% Black or African American, 1.2% Native American, 4.3% Asian, 0.1% Pacific Islander, and 2.8% from two or more races. 12.9% of the population were Hispanic or Latino of any race.

2010 census
As of the 2010 United States Census, there were 517,110 people and 206,522 households in the county. The population density was 1,574 people per square mile (978/km2). There were 219,580 housing units at an average density of 669 per square mile (415/km2). The racial makeup of the county was 76.4% White, 11.6% Black or African American, 0.7% Native American, 2.7% Asian, 0.1% Pacific Islander, 5.7% from some other race, and 2.8% from two or more races. 11.2% of the population were Hispanic or Latino of any race. 30% were of German, 15% Irish, 8.0% English, and 4.9% Italian ancestry.

The median income for a household in the county was $51,878, and the median income for a family was $67,666. Males had a median income of $44,542 versus $35,801 for females. The per capita income for the county was $28,092. About 9.4% of families and 13.1% of the population were below the poverty line, including 17.6% of those under age 18 and 8.0% of those age 65 or over.

2000 census
As of the 2000 United States Census, there were 463,585 people, 182,194 households, and 115,146 families in the county. The population density was 1,401 people per square mile (541/km2). There were 192,672 housing units at an average density of 582 per square mile (225/km2). The racial makeup of the county was 80.96% White, 11.50% Black or African American, 0.61% Native American, 1.71% Asian, 0.05% Pacific Islander, 3.40% from other races, and 1.76% from two or more races. 6.67% of the population were Hispanic or Latino of any race. 26.3% were of German, 11.5% Irish and 6.2% English ancestry.

There were 182,194 households, out of which 32.00% had children under the age of 18 living with them, 47.50% were married couples living together, 12.10% had a female householder with no husband present, and 36.80% were non-families. 29.80% of all households were made up of individuals, and 8.70% had someone living alone who was 65 years of age or older.  The average household size was 2.48 and the average family size was 3.12.

The county population contained 26.60% under the age of 18, 10.30% from 18 to 24, 31.20% from 25 to 44, 21.00% from 45 to 64, and 11.00% who were 65 years of age or older. The median age was 34 years. For every 100 females there were 95.70 males. For every 100 females age 18 and over, there were 92.90 males.

The median income for a household in the county was $43,209, and the median income for a family was $54,651. Males had a median income of $36,577 versus $27,265 for females. The per capita income for the county was $22,879. About 6.70% of families and 9.80% of the population were below the poverty line, including 13.00% of those under age 18 and 7.20% of those age 65 or over.

Government
Douglas County is governed by a board of seven county commissioners, elected to staggered four–year terms. County courthouse positions are also elected on a partisan basis. Most of the county's offices are located at the Douglas County Courthouse.

For much of the time after World War II, Douglas County was one of the more conservative urban counties in the United States. It supported the Republican candidate for president in all but one election from 1952 to 2004. However, it has become a far more competitive county in national elections compared to the rest of the state in the last ten years. Barack Obama won a majority of the county's votes in 2008, becoming the first Democrat to do so since 1964. He also narrowly carried the 2nd congressional district as well, garnering him one electoral vote statewide. It swung back to the Republican column in 2012 with Mitt Romney winning the county by an even closer majority. The county swung back to Democratic hands in 2016 with Hillary Clinton winning a plurality of its votes, but unlike Obama eight years prior she failed to carry the 2nd congressional district. In 2020, Joe Biden won the county by 11 points, a 56-year high for Democrats, and flipped the 2nd district back into the Democratic column. Congressman Don Bacon, a Republican won Douglas County in his race.

As of December 2020, Douglas County is one of three counties in Nebraska (alongside Thurston and Dakota) to have a plurality of registered Democrats.

Communities

Cities
 Bennington
 Omaha (county seat)
 East Omaha
 Elkhorn (Omaha)
 Millard (Omaha)
 North Omaha
 South Omaha
 West Omaha
 Ralston
 Valley

Villages
 Boys Town
 Waterloo

Census-designated places
 King Lake
 Venice

Unincorporated communities

 Briggs
 Debolt
 Elk City
 Irvington
 Lane

Education
School districts include:

 Arlington Public Schools
 Bennington Public Schools
 Douglas County West Community Schools
 Elkhorn Public Schools
 Fort Calhoun Community Schools
 Fremont Public Schools
 Gretna Public Schools
 Millard Public Schools
 Omaha Public Schools
 Ralston Public Schools
 Westside Community Schools
 Yutan Public Schools

A state-operated school, Nebraska School for the Deaf, was formerly in the county.

See also
 Ackerhurst Dairy Barn
 National Register of Historic Places listings in Douglas County, Nebraska

References

External links

 
1854 establishments in Nebraska Territory
Nebraska counties on the Missouri River
Populated places established in 1854